H&S can refer to:
 Health and safety, a cross-disciplinary area concerned with protecting people's safety, health and welfare.
 Head & Shoulders, a brand of shampoo
 Head and shoulders (chart pattern), a graphing pattern commonly found in financial markets
 Hack and slash, a role-playing game play style
 Headquarters and Service Company or Headquarters and Service Battalion in a U.S. Marine Corps regiment
 Heidrick & Struggles International Incorporated, an international executive search firm